Andrey Rublev and Dmitry Tursunov defeated the defending champion František Čermák and his partner Radu Albot in the final, 2–6, 6–1, [10–6] to win the men's doubles tennis title at the 2015 Kremlin Cup.

Čermák and Jiří Veselý were the reigning champions, but Veselý chose not to participate.

This tournament marked the first ATP Tour appearance of future singles world No. 1 and US Open champion Daniil Medvedev; partnering Aslan Karatsev, he lost in the quarterfinals to Čermák and Albot.

Seeds

Draw

Draw

References
 Main Draw

2015 Men's Doubles
Kremlin Cup - Doubles